Dekernes is a town in the center of the Dakahlia Governorate of Egypt. It is situated about 20 km east of Mansoura, the capital of Dakahlia.

Etymology
The town's name is pre-Arabic, but the exact etymology is unknown. Czapkiewicz suggests that it's derived from a Hellenised version of  through .

Education
The town is home to one of the oldest High schools in Egypt, Ali Mubarak School, which was built in 1911.

Climate 

Dekernes is classified by Köppen-Geiger climate classification system as hot desert (BWh).

Villages

Dekernes is the main city in markaz Dekernes. It is surrounded by many small villages which form a part of markaz Dekernes such as:

Local unit of Demouh:
 Demouh
 El Qibab El Kubra
 El Qibab El Sughra
 Kafr El Qibab
 El Gazeera
 Meit Dhafer
 El Mersaah
 Kafr Abdel Mo'men

Local unit of Demeshalt:
 Demeshalt
 Meit El Nahhal
 Kafr El Baz

Local unit of Negeir:
 Negeir
 El Qalyubiya
 El Azazna
 Kafr Abu Nasser

Others:
 El Mahmoudiya
 Manshat Abdel-Rahman
 Ashmun El Rumman (According to Gauthier, the original village name was "Chemoun Erman", a Coptic name, from which today's name is derived)
 Mit Tareif
 Mit Sudan
 Mit Sewiyd
 Mit Sharaf
 Mit Fares

Notable people
, an actor and producer.

Projects
In 2018 money was earmarked by the Egyptian Government for infrastructure projects in Dekernes.

References

Populated places in Dakahlia Governorate